FPM may refer to:

Companies and organisations
 First Prudential Markets, an Australian investment company
 Fédération patronale monégasque, a Monegasque employers organization
 Fondazzjoni Patrimonju Malti (English: Maltese Patrimony Foundation), a non-profit heritage foundation in Malta

Computing
 Effing Package Manager, a package manager for a computer's operating system.
 FastCGI Process Manager (PHP-FPM), a way to use PHP on a website
 Fast Page Mode DRAM, a type of computer memory

Education
 Faculté polytechnique de Mons, a Belgian engineering school
 Faculty of Pharmaceutical Medicine
 Fellowship of Postgraduate Medicine
 Fellow Programme in Management

Music
 Fantastic Plastic Machine (disambiguation)
 First Priority Music, an American record label

Politics
 Free Patriotic Movement, a Lebanese political party
 FrontPage Magazine, an American political website
 Morazanist Patriotic Front, a Honduran guerrilla group
 Popular Front of Moldova, a defunct Moldovan political movement
Force for Mexico (Spanish: Fuerza por México), a defunct Mexican political party

Science and measurement
 Feet per minute
 Finite point method
 Finite pointset method
 Flashes per minute for lighting accessories
 Fluorinated propylene monomer, a fluorocarbon elastomer also known by the initials FKM, and better known under the proprietary brand name Viton